"Breakthrough" is a song performed by the cast of 2011 American film Lemonade Mouth - formed by Bridgit Mendler, Adam Hicks, Hayley Kiyoko, Naomi Scott and Blake Michael. The song was written Bryan Todd, Maria Christensen, Shridhar Solanki and Adam Hicks and produced by Twin &  Bryan Todd. It was released as the album's third and final single, releasing on May 2, 2011 through Walt Disney Records.

Composition
Mendler's vocals span from the low note of C3 to the high note of E5.

Chart performance
The song debuted and peaked at number 88 on the US Billboard Hot 100 and at number 11 on the US Top Heatseekers chart.

Music video
The music video was taken from the scene in the film when the band sings the song.

Track listing
Digital download
 Breakthrough — 3:27

Charts

References 

2011 singles
Bridgit Mendler songs
Songs written by Bryan Todd (record producer)
Walt Disney Records singles